The Salina Rattlers were a professional basketball franchise based in Salina, Kansas, that competed for one season in the International Basketball Association (IBA). They played their home games at the Bicentennial Center. The team folded along with the IBA after the 2000–01 season.

Defunct basketball teams in the United States
Basketball teams in Kansas
Sports in Salina, Kansas
Basketball teams established in 2000
Basketball teams disestablished in 2001
2000 establishments in Kansas
2001 disestablishments in Kansas